Cornelius Jeremiah Vanderbilt (December 29, 1830 – April 2, 1882) was an American member of the Vanderbilt family. After having a troubled relationship with his father, Cornelius Vanderbilt, he eventually committed suicide at the age of 51.

Early life
Cornelius "Corneel" Jeremiah Vanderbilt was born on Staten Island on December 29, 1830. He was the second son of thirteen children born to Cornelius Vanderbilt and Sophia Johnson Vanderbilt, who were first cousins. He had 11 siblings who survived to adulthood; Phebe, Ethelinda, Eliza, William ("Billy"), Emily, Sophia, Maria, Frances, Mary, Catherine, and George (who died in 1863 at age 24). Corneel had another brother named George, born in 1832, who died as a child.

According to official records, Corneel matriculated at Columbia College with the class of 1850, but did not graduate with the class.

When he was 18 years old, Corneel began suffering from epilepsy, which his father saw as weakness and even mental derangement, believing his son needed to be in a mental asylum. His father thought the epileptic fits were a punishment on himself for his having married his own cousin.

In 1849, in order to "toughen him up", his father sent the then 18-year-old Corneel off to be a sailor aboard a three-masted schooner which was making its way to California and its gold fields. However, Corneel was stricken ill when he arrived in San Francisco and drew a draft on his father in order to pay for his return to New York. Upon his return, his father had him arrested for drawing the draft and committed him to the Bloomingdale Insane Asylum. Corneel's records from the asylum state: "Form of mental disorder: dementia (supported by father)".

He was finally discharged from the asylum on February 20, 1850.

Corneel being committed to Bloomingdale Insane Asylum by his father happened just five years after his mother, Sophia, had also briefly been committed by his father to the same asylum. In 1844, his father sent Sophia on a trip to Canada with one of their daughters, in order to have more private time with their governess (who promptly quit). When Sophia returned, she found that her husband had purchased a large townhouse at 10 Washington Place in New York City and intended it to be their new residence. She was so upset that she stood up to the domineering Cornelius and steadfastly refused to leave their Staten Island home and friends. The Commodore decided that she was mentally unstable due to this behavior. He told their children that their mother was "in poor health" and that she "was at the change of life." Against protests from all of their children (except William), their father had their mother committed to Bloomingdale Insane Asylum. However, the physicians there insisted she return home. When she did, she reluctantly acquiesced to her husband's demands and moved to Manhattan.

Career

On March 4, 1849, young Vanderbilt departed on a ship headed for San Francisco around Cape Horn to work as a crewman. Upon arrival in San Francisco, he abandoned the ship and spent all his money. When he ran out, he tried to charge his expenses to his father, who became livid and interpreted Corneel's actions as a sign of insanity.  When Corneel returned to New York in November 1849, his father had him arrested and committed to the Bloomingdale Insane Asylum in New York until February 1850.

After his release, he tried out several occupations, including law clerk, leather merchant, farmer, and revenue agent; all of which he was unsuccessful at.  He developed a gambling problem and reportedly used the Vanderbilt name and his considerable charm to borrow money, usually without paying them back.  In particular, he obtained significant loans from Horace Greeley, the editor of the New York Tribune who was a long-time friend.  Corneel was also close friends with Schuyler Colfax, who later became the 17th Vice President of the United States under Ulysses S. Grant.

In January 1854, the elder Cornelius again had Corneel arrested and committed to the asylum on the grounds of "confusion" and "loose habits."  The doctor at the asylum reportedly told Corneel, "I am satisfied that you are no more crazy than I am," and let him go home.  His elder brother William told him that they were trying to get him committed to the Asylum in order to avoid Corneel being charged criminally for his acts of forgery, to which Corneel reportedly replied that he would rather be considered a damn rascal than a lunatic.

Personal life
In 1856, he married Ellen Williams (1820–1872) of Hartford, Connecticut, the daughter of a minister. They had no children. The marriage was reportedly the only thing in Corneel's life that pleased his father. With funds from his allowance, Corneel set up a fruit farm in East Hartford, Connecticut, but was unable to make the farm solvent, and had to file for bankruptcy in 1868.

After his mother's death in 1868, and the death of his wife in 1872, Vanderbilt "took up with George Terry, an unmarried hotel keeper whom Corneel considered 'my dearest friend.'" Vanderbilt biographer T. J. Stiles has questioned whether the two may have been lovers, which the elder Cornelius may have suspected.  Their letters between each other were intense, including a letter where Vanderbilt writes: "Oh! George I cannot give you up. You must not desert me now, but must be brave & patient, and give me encouragement and hope for the future."  Terry met with the Commodore in December 1873 about a business proposition in Toledo, Ohio, to which he replied: "Mr. Terry, if you go to Toledo, what will become of Corneel?"

Father's estate

Upon his father's death in 1877, his elder brother William inherited the vast majority of the Vanderbilt estate and holdings (around $100,000,000), becoming the wealthiest man in the United States.  According to his father's will, Corneel was only to inherit the income from $200,000 in U.S. Bonds held in trust (receiving 5% interest), which was distributed by trustees who were cautioned to oversee his behavior.  Additionally, should Corneel try to advance funds from the Trust, he would lose it altogether.

After a lengthy court battle, William eventually paid Corneel an extra $600,000 ($200,000 in cash and $400,000 in additional trust) allowing him to pay off his debts, including to the estate of the late Horace Greeley, which aggregated to approximately $61,000 including interest. According to his obituary, "almost immediately after the settlement Cornelius J. went to Europe, accompanied by his particular friend, Mr. Terry, and remained abroad over six months."

The Commodore had purchased a 110-acre West Hartford estate in 1857 as a place for Corneel to live. The land was not developed, and after the death of Corneel's wife in 1872, the Commodore sold the property. In 1879, two years after the elder Cornelius's death, Corneel repurchased the estate.  After regaining the estate, he built a 30-room mansion, designed by John C. Mead, on the land.

1882 suicide
On April 2, 1882, reportedly after a night spent at a gambling house, the 51-year-old C.J. Vanderbilt committed suicide by firing his Smith & Wesson revolver into his left temple while staying in his fifth floor room, number 80, at the Glenham Hotel on Fifth Avenue in New York City.  He was discovered by George Terry, who was referred to in Vanderbilt's obituary as "his friend and constant companion." Terry was staying in an adjoining room, number 79, and reportedly rushed through the connecting door to Corneel's room upon hearing the gunshot that killed the latter.

Vanderbilt left his recently finished mansion in Hartford, which he was supposed to move into a few weeks later, to his dearest friend Terry, who sold the estate; it was subdivided into 32 building lots. The mansion was torn down in 1918, and today the property is part of the West Hill Historic District.

Notes

References

External links
 
 Chapter XXXVI "Young Corneel": The Eccentricities of Cornelius Jeremiah Vanderbilt, from Henry Clews' 1888 memoir, Twenty-eight Years in Wall Street.

1830 births
1882 deaths
American people of Dutch descent
People from Staten Island
American gamblers
Cornelius Jeremiah
Columbia College (New York) alumni
19th-century American Episcopalians
19th-century American businesspeople
1880s suicides
Suicides by firearm in New York City